All Thats fourth season''' ran from November 15, 1997, to April 4, 1998. 21 episodes aired.

The show saw many changes before the start of the season. Original/former cast members Katrina Johnson and Alisa Reyes both had left the show, and former new cast member Tricia Dickson was fired to make room for new cast members. The producers hired Danny Tamberelli, Christy Knowings and Leon Frierson. This would be the final season for Lori Beth Denberg; in a live chat on Nick.com, she reasoned that she left All That'', because she "was getting older." Denberg was the last original female cast member on the show before her departure.

The intro for this season features the cast on a red carpet premiere in old Hollywood. The cast exit separately out of a limo and walk down the carpet, where they are greeted by fans who are throwing roses and taking pictures. The musical guest is shown followed by the entire cast standing on the stairs as people take their pictures.

Cast

Repertory players
 Amanda Bynes
 Lori Beth Denberg
 Leon Frierson
 Christy Knowings
 Kel Mitchell
 Josh Server
 Danny Tamberelli
 Kenan Thompson

Episodes

References

1997 American television seasons
1998 American television seasons
All That seasons